Darkins is a surname. Notable people with the surname include:

Chris Darkins (born 1974), American football player
Jack Darkins, British tennis player

See also
David (name), where this surname originated

References